Buckam Singh (December 5, 1893 – August 27, 1919) was a Canadian Sikh soldier in the First World War and early Sikh pioneer to Ontario.

Early life 
Buckam Singh was born on December 5, 1893, in the farming town of Mahilpur, Punjab, India, to Badan Singh and Chandi Kaur, into a  Sikh family, In March 1903, at age 10, the young Buckam Singh was married to Pritam Kaur of Jamsher in an arranged marriage. At the time, India was still under British control, and as such, many Sikhs enlisted in the British Army due to their warrior tradition that dated back to the time of Guru Hargobind in the 17th century. In 1887, some Sikh soldiers travelled from India (Punjab) to reach Britain to celebrate Queen Victoria's Diamond Jubilee. They traveled by train across Canada and fell in love with the landscape of British Columbia. Upon their return to Punjab, word about Canada spread and the 14-year-old Singh left for British Columbia in 1907.

At the time of Buckam Singh's immigration to Canada there was a labour shortage in British Columbia, and while the Canadians did not like to give jobs to foreigners, they had no choice. Later in 1907, riots in Vancouver prompted the Canadian government to institute racist laws which required all South Asian immigrants to come from their homeland to Canada in one continuous journey, a feat impossible for the Sikhs as there was no direct route from India to Canada. Additionally, all new immigrants had to have $250 in savings, ten times the amount European immigrants had to have. This was quite a large amount as at the time wages were just cents a week. Because of these discriminatory conditions, Singh moved to Ontario and began working for a farmer in Rosebank.

Wartime 

On August 5, 1914, Canada entered the First World War as a member of the British Empire. On April 23 the next year, Buckam Singh enlisted in the Canadian Overseas Expeditionary Force and became one out of the nine Canadian Sikhs allowed to fight for Canada in the war. He was then sent to Barriefield Camp near Kingston, Ontario, and joined the 59th Battalion. On his attestation papers he just  recorded as of the Church of England religion, as there was no option for Sikh.

Because of the need to deploy troops to the Western Front as quickly as possible, Buckam Singh received training and was shipped out in the first of two contingents of 250 men aboard the S.S. Scandinavian 2 on August 27, 1915, arriving in England on September 5. There, Buckam Singh was transferred to the 39th Reserve Battalion to await deployment to a combat battalion. On January 21, 1916, Buckam Singh arrived in France and joined the 20th Battalion. While fighting, he was hit on the head with shrapnel on June 2, 1916, and sent to hospital until the end of the month, when he rejoined his battalion. He was again wounded at St. Eloi on July 24 and sent to a hospital run by John McCrae and then crossed the English Channel to make his recovery in Manchester. 

On March 11, 1917, Singh was considered fit enough to rejoin active combat and was sent to the Central Ontario Regimental Depot and waited to be sent to France again. However, he developed severe tuberculosis and was sent back to Canada in May. He was discharged on August 1, 1918, and spent the remainder of his days at Freeport Military Hospital, where he died on August 27, 1919. He is buried at Mount Hope Cemetery in Kitchener, Ontario. His grave is the only known military grave in Canada of a Sikh soldier from the World Wars.

References

External links 
 SikhMuseum.com Exhibit: Private Buckam Singh, Discovering a Canadian Hero
 Annual Sikh Remembrance Day ceremony at Pvt. Buckam Singh's grave
 A Historical Account on Private Buckam Singh

1893 births
1919 deaths
Canadian Expeditionary Force soldiers
Canadian Sikhs
Emigrants from British India to Canada
Canadian people of Indian descent
Canadian people of Punjabi descent
20th-century deaths from tuberculosis
Punjabi people
Tuberculosis deaths in Ontario